The men's hammer throw event at the 2015 Asian Athletics Championships was held on June 4.

Results

References

Hammer
Hammer throw at the Asian Athletics Championships